Samuel Doak (1749–1830) was an American Presbyterian clergyman, Calvinist educator, and a former slave owner in the early movement in the United States for the abolition of slavery.

Early life
Samuel Doak was born August 1, 1749, in Augusta County, Virginia, to Scotch-Irish immigrants Samuel and Jane (Mitchell) Doak. He grew up on a frontier farm and began his education with Robert Alexander, who later founded the Academy of Liberty Hall (now Washington and Lee University). After attending an academy in Maryland, he entered the College of New Jersey (now Princeton), from which he graduated two years later in 1775. Doak married Esther Houston Montgomery of Augusta County in October 1775.

Career
Doak taught at Hampden-Sydney College in the spring of 1776. There he studied theology under president Samuel Stanhope Smith, and completed his theological training in 1777 at Liberty Hall. He assumed his first pastorate in Abingdon, Virginia, and also began to "ride circuit" in eastern Tennessee.

In 1778 Doak settled in Tennessee in Sullivan County and was ordained a Presbyterian minister. Moving to the Holston valley in Tennessee, Doak assumed the Presbytery's charge to serve the congregation of the Fork Church, now known as New Bethel Presbyterian Church.

In 1780, Doak relocated from Sullivan County and to the western section Washington County near present-day Limestone, Tennessee, where he formed where he founded Salem Presbyterian Church, built a home, and constructed a school.

Doak, during this same time in 1780, regularly preached to settlers at the Big Spring at Greeneville, Tennessee in present-day Greene County. Later in 1783, Mt. Bethel Presbyterian Church (now First Presbyterian Church) was formed with Hezekiah Balch being the first settled minister.

The school that Doak had constructed at his Salem Presbyterian Church during 1780 was later chartered as St. Martin's Academy in 1783.  St. Martin's Academy expanded in 1795 as Washington College.
 
Doak served as president of Washington College (1795-1818) before turning it over to his oldest son, John Whitfield Doak. Esther Doak had died in 1807, and in 1818 he moved with his second wife, Margaretta Houston McEwen, to Tusculum Academy (later Tusculum College) and taught there with his son Samuel W. Doak until his death on December 12, 1830. He is buried at Salem Church.

Doak was awarded a Doctor of Divinity degree for his tireless efforts at promoting Presbyterianism and education. He was generally known as "the Presbyterian Bishop."

After becoming convinced of the iniquity of slavery, he freed his own slaves in 1818. Afterwards, for the rest of his life, Doak advocated immediate abolition. He was referred to as being "the apostle of learning and religion in the West."

Legacy
Three schools in Greene County are named for Samuel Doak:
 Doak Elementary School, located less than a mile away from his two-story home
 Chuckey-Doak Middle School, estimated at a mile away
 Chuckey-Doak High School, directly behind the middle school
The Doak House Museum is a non-profit, educational institution, established as a museum in 1975.

References

Sprague, Annals of the American Pulpit, volume III  (New York, 1857)
 
 Salem Presbyterian Church

1749 births
1830 deaths
American educators
American abolitionists
American Presbyterian ministers
Presbyterian abolitionists
Princeton University alumni
People from the State of Franklin
People from Greeneville, Tennessee
People from Greene County, Tennessee
Presbyterian Church in the United States of America ministers
Presbyterians from Tennessee
Tusculum University
Tusculum, Tennessee
Greeneville, Tennessee